Rock'n'roll Etiquette is the seventh studio album by Japanese rock band Guitar Wolf. It was released in Japan in February 2000 and in the U.S. on 19 October 2004. The U.S. version of the album includes the extra track "The Way I Walk".

Track listing
 God-Speed-You
 Jet Virus
 Hot Air Jiro
 Murder by Rock
 Toiletface
 Venus Drive
 Sore Loser
 Drives with Wolves
 Sky Star Jet
 Earth Love
 Teardrop Baby
 Route 66
 Three AM Noodle Shop
 Highway Baby
 Rock'n'roll Etiquette
 The Way I Walk (U.S. version)

2000 albums
Guitar Wolf albums